Mary Arundell  may refer to:

Mary Arundell (courtier) (died 1557)
Mary Arundell, Baroness Arundell (c. 1563–1607)
Mary or Margaret Arundell (died 1691), wife of John Arundell, 2nd Baron Arundell of Trerice